Hugh Neville "Kork" Ballington (born 10 April 1951) is a South African former professional motorcycle racer. He competed in the Grand Prix motorcycle racing world championships from 1976 to 1982, most prominently as a member of the Kawasaki factory racing team. The four-time FIM road racing world champion was inducted into the MotoGP Legends Hall of Fame in 2018.



Motorcycle racing career
Born in Salisbury, Southern Rhodesia, Ballington used his domestic production road racing experience as a springboard to gain entry into the British racing scene. He raced an over-the-counter Yamaha twin for several years before taking a well-earned place on the Kawasaki factory racing team riding Kawasaki KR250 and KR350s alongside Mick Grant and Barry Ditchburn. In the 250 and 350 classes, Ballington swept away the competition on his Kawasakis in 1978 and 1979, capturing consecutive double world championships.

In 1980, he campaigned Kawasaki's new KR500 but developing a new bike proved to be difficult in the premier class. After three years in the 500cc class, he couldn't repeat the success he enjoyed in the smaller classes and retired from competition. Ballington now lives with his family in Brisbane, Australia.

In 2018, MotoGP announced he would be inducted into the MotoGP Legends Hall of Fame.

Motorcycle Grand Prix results

(key) (Races in bold indicate pole position; races in italics indicate fastest lap)

References

Zimbabwean people of British descent
White Rhodesian people
Zimbabwean emigrants to South Africa
Zimbabwean emigrants to Australia
South African emigrants to Australia
Sportspeople from Harare
Sportspeople from Pietermaritzburg
South African motorcycle racers
250cc World Championship riders
350cc World Championship riders
500cc World Championship riders
1951 births
Living people
250cc World Riders' Champions
350cc World Riders' Champions